Alex James Dyer (born 11 June 1990) is a Montserratian footballer who plays as a midfielder for Wealdstone. He represents Montserrat internationally.

Club career
Dyer is a product of the Northampton Town's youth system and agreed a professional contract in 2007. In April 2008 he was awarded 'League Two Apprentice of the Month'. He made his debut on 29 August 2007 in a 2–0 League Cup defeat to Middlesbrough at the Riverside Stadium, and scored his first goal in a 2–1 win against Luton Town the same season. He signed a two-year contract extension with Northampton in February 2009. During the 2009–10 season, Dyer was more of a first team player due to Northampton Town being in League Two, playing 20 games and scoring two goals against Notts County and Bradford City. He was released by the club on 12 May 2010 along with five other players, with manager Ian Sampson stating that he had not progressed as he had hoped and that younger players like teammate Michael Jacobs should be given a chance.

Dyer joined Grimsby Town on trial following his release from Northampton, but after playing in one match he was let go having failed to impress the club's management. Subsequently, Dyer went on to sign for Wealdstone in the Isthmian League Premier Division. After 32 goals in 117 games for Wealdstone, he signed for newly promoted Conference National side Welling United, who clinched the Conference South title the previous year.

On 11 December 2013, it was announced that Dyer would be departing Welling United in order to join Swedish tier two side Östersunds FK.

On 4 March 2019, Dyer joined Eliteserien side Lillestrøm on loan from Elfsborg until 1 August.

After a spell in Kuwait playing for Al Tadhamon, Dyer re-joined Wealdstone on a short-term deal on 2 October 2020. He scored his first goal back at the Stones against Wrexham on 17 October 2020, in a 4–3 win, and went on to appear 34 times and score twice as Wealdstone ended the season in 19th. On 26 June 2021, it was announced that Dyer had signed a new one-year contract with the club

International career 
Dyer was called up to the Montserrat national team in 2011, for their 2014 FIFA World Cup CONCACAF First Round qualifiers against Belize. He made his debut against Belize on 15 June, in their home fixture, which was played at Ato Boldon Stadium in Couva, Trinidad and Tobago. Montserrat lost 5–2. After making two appearances in June 2021, Dyer reached seventeen caps making him the nation's joint-record appearance holder.

References

External links
Alex Dyer profile at Northampton Town F.C.

Living people
1990 births
People from Täby Municipality
English people of Montserratian descent
Swedish people of Montserratian descent
Sportspeople from Stockholm County
Montserratian footballers
English footballers
Swedish footballers
Montserrat international footballers
Association football midfielders
Northampton Town F.C. players
Wealdstone F.C. players
Welling United F.C. players
Östersunds FK players
IF Elfsborg players
Lillestrøm SK players
Al Tadhamon SC players
English Football League players
Isthmian League players
National League (English football) players
Allsvenskan players
Superettan players
Eliteserien players
Kuwait Premier League players
Black British sportsmen
Competitors at the 2015 Summer Universiade
Universiade medalists in football
Montserratian expatriate footballers
English expatriate footballers
Expatriate footballers in Norway
Montserratian expatriate sportspeople in Norway
English expatriate sportspeople in Norway
Expatriate footballers in Kuwait
Montserratian expatriate sportspeople in Kuwait
English expatriate sportspeople in Kuwait
Universiade silver medalists for Great Britain
Medalists at the 2013 Summer Universiade